Naomi Shihab Nye (born March 12, 1952) is an American poet, editor, songwriter, and novelist. Born to a Palestinian father and an American mother, she began composing her first poetry at the age of six. In total, she has published or contributed to over 30 volumes of poetry. Her works include poetry, young-adult fiction, picture books, and novels. Nye received the 2013 NSK Neustadt Prize for Children's Literature in honor of her entire body of work as a writer, and in 2019 the Poetry Foundation designated her the Young People's Poet Laureate for the 2019–21 term.

Early life
Naomi Shihab Nye is a poet and songwriter born in 1952 to a Palestinian father, who worked as a journalist, editor and writer, and American mother, who worked as a Montessori school teacher. Her father grew up in Palestine. He and his family became refugees in 1948, when the state of Israel was created. She has said her father "seemed a little shell-shocked when I was a child." She grew up initially in Ferguson, St. Louis County, Missouri. In 1966, when Nye was 14, the family moved to the West Bank, Palestine when her father's mother was sick. After less than a year, before the 1967 Six-Day War occurred, they moved to San Antonio, Texas.

Nye graduated from Robert E. Lee High School, where she was editor of the literary magazine. She earned a BA in English and world religions from Trinity University in 1974 and has lived in San Antonio ever since.

Career

Teaching writing
After graduation, Nye worked as a writer-in-schools with the Texas Commission on the Arts. She has continued to teach writing workshops, mostly to kids. Currently, she teaches creative writing at Texas State University.

Writing
Nye characterizes herself as a "wandering poet," and says that much of her poetry is inspired by her childhood memories and her travels. She considers San Antonio her current home, "San Antonio feels most like home as I have lived here the longest. But everywhere can be home the moment you unpack, make a tiny space that feels agreeable". San Antonio is the inspiration behind many of her poems. Both roots and sense of place are major themes in her body of work. Her poems are frank and accessible, often making use of ordinary images in startling ways. Her ability to enter into foreign experiences and chronicle them from the inside is reminiscent of Elizabeth Bishop, while her simple and direct "voice" is akin to that of her mentor William Stafford.

Her first collection of poems, Different Ways to Pray, explored the theme of similarities and differences between cultures, which would become one of her lifelong areas of focus. Her other books include poetry collections 19 Varieties of Gazelle: Poems of the Middle East, Red Suitcase, and Fuel; a collection of essays entitled Never in a Hurry; a young-adult novel called Habibi (the autobiographical story of an Arab-American teenager who moves to Jerusalem in the 1970s) and picture book Lullaby Raft, which is also the title of one of her two albums of music. (The other is called Rutabaga-Roo; both were limited-edition.)

Nye's first two chapter books, Tattooed Feet (1977) and Eye-to-Eye (1978), are written in free verse and possess themes of questing. Nye's first full-length collection, Different Ways to Pray (1980), explores the differences between and shared experiences of cultures from California to Texas and from South America to Mexico. Hugging the Jukebox (1982), a full-length collection that won the Voertman Poetry Prize, focuses on the connections between diverse peoples and on the perspectives of those in other lands. Yellow Glove (1986) presents poems with more tragic and sorrowful themes. According to the Poetry Foundation, Fuel (1998) may be Nye's most acclaimed volume and ranges over a variety of subjects, scenes and settings.

Nye's poem Famous was referenced and quoted in full by Judge Andre Davis in his concurring opinion on the case G. G. v. Gloucester County School Board.

Her poem So much happiness was included in the 'Happiness' edition of Parabola.

Editing anthologies
Nye has edited many anthologies of poems, for audiences both young and old. One of the best-known is This Same Sky: A Collection of Poems from around the World, which contains translated work by 129 poets from 68 different countries. Her most recent anthology is called Is This Forever, Or What?: Poems & Paintings from Texas.

Awards and recognition
Nye has won many awards and fellowships, among them four Pushcart Prizes, the Jane Addams Children's Book Award, the Paterson Poetry Prize, and many notable book and best book citations from the American Library Association, and a 2,000 Witter Bynner Fellowship. In 1997, Trinity University, her alma mater, honored her with the Distinguished Alumna Award.

In 1997, Nye became a Guggenheim Poetry Fellow. In 2000, Nye became a Witter Bynner Fellow, awarded by the Library of Congress. In 2002, she became a Lannan Literary Fellow. In June 2009, Nye was named as one of PeaceByPeace.com's first peace heroes. In 2013, Nye won the Robert Creeley Award.

In October 2012, she was named laureate of the 2013 NSK Neustadt Prize for Children's Literature. The NSK Prize is a juried award sponsored by the University of Oklahoma and World Literature Today magazine. In her nominating statement, Ibtisam Barakat, the juror who championed Nye for the award wrote, "Naomi's incandescent humanity and voice can change the world, or someone's world, by taking a position not one word less beautiful than an exquisite poem." Barakat commended her work by saying, "Naomi's poetry masterfully blends music, images, colors, languages, and insights into poems that ache like a shore pacing in ebb and flow, expecting the arrival of meaning."

In 2019, the Poetry Foundation designated Nye their Young People's Poet Laureate for the 2019–21 term. The Foundation's announcement characterized Nye's writing style as one that "moves seamlessly between ages in a way that is accessible, warm, and sophisticated even for the youngest of readers."

Personal life
Although she calls herself a "wandering poet", Shihab Nye refers to San Antonio as her home and lives there with her family. She says a visit to her grandmother in the West Bank village of Sinjil was a life-changing experience. In 1978, she married Michael Nye, who worked initially as an attorney and latterly on photography and on writing on topics including hunger, teenage pregnancy and mental illness. They have one son.

Published works

Poetry

On the Edge of the Sky. Iguana Press. 1981. 
 
 
Invisible: Poems. The Trilobite Press. 1987. 
Mint. State Street Press Chapbooks. 1991. 
 
Words Under the Words. The Eighth Mountain Press. 1994. . 
 
Mint Snowball. Anhinga Press. 2001. . 
 
 
 A Maze Me: Poems for Girls. Greenwillow Books. 2005.  
 Tender Spot: Selected Poems. Bloodaxe Books. 2008. 
 
Sometimes I Pretend: A Poem [artist's book]. Santa Cruz, California: Peter and Donna Thomas. 2014. 
The Tiny Journalist: Poems. BOA Editions, Ltd. 2019. 
 "Kindness"

Children's poetry 
 What Have You Lost? (with Michael Nye). Greenwillow Books. 1999. . 
Come With Me: Poems for a Journey. Greenwillow Books. 2000. . 
 Is This Forever or What?: Poems and Paintings from Texas. Greenwillow Books. 2003. . 
19 Varieties of Gazelle: Poems of the Middle East. Greenwillow Books. 2005. . 
 Honeybee: poems & short prose. Greenwillow Books. 2008.  .
 Voices in the Air: Poems for Listeners. Greenwillow Books. 2018. .
 Everything Comes Next: Collected and New Poems. Greenwillow Books. 2020.

Poetry in anthologies 
The Best American Poetry. Scribner Poetry. 2003.

Essays 
 Never in a Hurry: Essays on People and Places. University of South Carolina Press. 1996. .

Novels
 Habibi. Simon Pulse. 1999. .
 Going, Going. Greenwillow Books. 2005. 
 The Turtle of Oman. Greenwillow Books. 2014. .
 The Turtle of Michigan. Greenwillow Books. 2022. .

Short stories
 
Hamadi
Tomorrow, Summer

Discography
 Rutabaga-Roo – I've Got a Song and It's for You (Flying Cat, 1979)

Editor
 Naomi Shihab Nye, ed. (1995). The Tree Is Older Than You Are: A Bilingual Gathering of Poems & Stories from Mexico with Paintings by Mexican Artists. Simon & Schuster Children's Publishing. . 
Naomi Shihab Nye, Paul B. Janeczko, eds. (1996). I Feel a Little Jumpy Around You: Paired Poems by Men & Women. Simon & Schuster. . 

 Naomi Shihab Nye, ed. (1998). The Space Between Our Footsteps. Simon & Schuster Children's Publishing. . 

Naomi Shihab Nye, ed. (2010). Time You Let Me In: 25 Poets Under 25. Greenwillow Books. .

Critical studies
 Gómez-Vega, Ibis. "The Art of Telling Stornoyies in the Poetry of Naomi Shihab Nye." MELUS 26.4 (Winter 2001): 245-252.
 Gómez-Vega, Ibis. "Extreme Realities: Naomi Shihab Nye's Essays and Poems." Alif: Journal of Comparative Poetics 30 (2010): 109-133.
 Mercer, Lorraine, and Linda Strom. "Counter Narratives: Cooking Up Stories of Love and Loss in Naomi Shihab Nye's Poetry and Diana Abu-Jaber's Crescent." MELUS 32.4 (Winter 2007): 
 Orfalea, Gregory. "Doomed by Our Blood to Care: The Poetry of Naomi Shihab Nye." Paintbrush 18.35 (Spring 1991): 56-66.

Forewords
 Clack, Cary, (2009). Clowns and Rats Scare Me. Trinity University Press. 
 Stafford, William, (2014). The Osage Orange Tree. Trinity University Press. 
 Ornelas, Christopher, (2017). Name Them—They Fly Better: Pat Hammond’s Theory of Aerodynamics. Trinity University Press.

References

Further reading
"Biography of an Armenian Schoolgirl," "The Shapes of Mouths at Parties," and "So Much Happiness" by Naomi Shihab Nye in Kalliope: A Journal of Women's Literature and Art.
Art at Our Doorstep: San Antonio Writers and Artists featuring Naomi Shihab Nye. Edited by Nan Cuba and Riley Robinson (Trinity University Press, 2008).

External links

 A Guide to the Naomi Shihab Nye Papers University of Texas at San Antonio Libraries (UTSA Libraries) Special Collections.
 
 Naomi Shihab Nye | Steven Barclay Agency
 Naomi Shihab Nye: Profile and Poems at Poets.org
 On growing up in Ferguson and Palestine
 Naomi Shihab Nye — Your Life Is a Poem

20th-century American women writers
21st-century American women writers
20th-century American novelists
21st-century American novelists
20th-century American poets
21st-century American poets
20th-century American short story writers
21st-century American short story writers
American women poets
Women writers of young adult literature
American young adult novelists
American writers of Palestinian descent
Writers from San Antonio
Trinity University (Texas) alumni
1952 births
Living people